Eutychide physcella is a butterfly in the family Hesperiidae. It is found in Brazil (Rio de Janeiro) and Argentina.

References

Butterflies described in 1866
Hesperiinae
Hesperiidae of South America
Taxa named by William Chapman Hewitson